Spleen and Ideal is the second studio album by Australian band Dead Can Dance. It was released on 25 November 1985 by 4AD. The album spearheaded the group's sonic transition from their post-punk and gothic rock-influenced roots towards a neoclassical dark wave style.

Background 
The band's official website stated that the album title was taken "from 19th Century symbolist ideals". The title is directly taken from "Spleen et Idéal", a collection of poems by French poet Charles Baudelaire which form a section of his magnum opus Les Fleurs du mal.

Discussing the album's musical style, AllMusic commented that with Spleen and Ideal, Dead Can Dance "fully took the plunge into the heady mix of musical traditions that would come to define its sound and style for the remainder of its career. The straightforward goth affectations are exchanged for a sonic palette and range of imagination".

The cover image shows the partial demolition of Grain Elevator No. 2 at Salford Quays, part of Manchester and Salford Docks.

Track listing

Critical reception 

In a retrospective review, AllMusic praised the album, calling it "amazing [...] 'haunting' and 'atmospheric' barely [scratch] even the initial surface of the album's power".

Release history

Chart history

Personnel 
 Lisa Gerrard – vocals, all other instruments, production
 Brendan Perry – vocals, all other instruments, production, sleeve art direction
 Gus Ferguson – cello
 Martin McCarrick – cello
 James Pinker – timpani
 Tony Ayres – timpani
 Richard Avison – trombone
 Simon Hogg – trombone
 Carolyn Costin – violin
 Andrew Hutton – soprano vocals on track 1

 Technical
 John A. Rivers – production, engineering
 Jonathan Dee – engineering
 Colin Gray – sleeve photography

References

External links 
 
 

Dead Can Dance albums
1985 albums
4AD albums
Albums produced by John A. Rivers